Swini Nimesh Khara is an Indian actress and a student at Narsee Monjee College of Commerce & Economics, Vile Parle, Mumbai. She is known for her role as the mischievous Chaitali in the TV show Baa Bahoo Aur Baby and for a role in the 2007 film Cheeni Kum. She also did an episodic role in CID as Shweta.

Filmography

Films
 2005 - Parineeta
 2005 - Elaan as Ayesha (Arjun's Daughter)
 2006 - After The Wedding
 2006 - Siyaasat The Politics
 2006 - Chingaari 
 2007 - Cheeni Kum as Sexy
 2008 - Hari Puttar as Tuk Tuk
 2010 - Paathshala as Swini 
 2010 - Kaalo - The Desert Witch as Shona
 2012 - Delhi Safari as Yuvraj, the cub Leopard
 2016 - M.S. Dhoni: The Untold Story as young Jayanti

Television
 2005–2010 - Baa Bahoo Aur Baby as Chaitali Thakkar
 2007/2009 - Dill Mill Gayye as Minnie
 2011 - CID as Shweta 
 2015 - Zindagi Khatti Meethi as Tara

References

External links

Living people
1998 births